The following is a list of integrals (antiderivative functions) of rational functions. 
Any rational function can be integrated by partial fraction decomposition of the function into a sum of functions of the form:
 , and 
which can then be integrated term by term.

For other types of functions, see lists of integrals.

Miscellaneous integrands

Integrands of the form xm(a x + b)n 

Many of the following antiderivatives have a term of the form ln |ax + b|.  Because this is undefined when x = −b / a, the most general form of the antiderivative replaces the constant of integration with a locally constant function.  However, it is conventional to omit this from the notation.  For example,

is usually abbreviated as

where C is to be understood as notation for a locally constant function of x.  This convention will be adhered to in the following.

 (Cavalieri's quadrature formula)

Integrands of the form xm / (a x2 + b x + c)n 

For

Integrands of the form xm (a + b xn)p 
 The resulting integrands are of the same form as the original integrand, so these reduction formulas can be repeatedly applied to drive the exponents m and p toward 0.
 These reduction formulas can be used for integrands having integer and/or fractional exponents.

Integrands of the form (A + B x) (a + b x)m (c + d x)n (e + f x)p 
 The resulting integrands are of the same form as the original integrand, so these reduction formulas can be repeatedly applied to drive the exponents m, n and p toward 0.
 These reduction formulas can be used for integrands having integer and/or fractional exponents.
 Special cases of these reductions formulas can be used for integrands of the form  by setting B to 0.

Integrands of the form xm (A + B xn) (a + b xn)p (c + d xn)q 
 The resulting integrands are of the same form as the original integrand, so these reduction formulas can be repeatedly applied to drive the exponents m, p and q toward 0.
 These reduction formulas can be used for integrands having integer and/or fractional exponents.

Integrands of the form (d + e x)m (a + b x + c x2)p when b2 − 4 a c = 0 
 The resulting integrands are of the same form as the original integrand, so these reduction formulas can be repeatedly applied to drive the exponents m and p toward 0.
 These reduction formulas can be used for integrands having integer and/or fractional exponents.
 Special cases of these reductions formulas can be used for integrands of the form  when  by setting m to 0.

Integrands of the form (d + e x)m (A + B x) (a + b x + c x2)p 
 The resulting integrands are of the same form as the original integrand, so these reduction formulas can be repeatedly applied to drive the exponents m and p toward 0.
 These reduction formulas can be used for integrands having integer and/or fractional exponents.

Integrands of the form xm (a + b xn + c x2n)p when b2 − 4 a c = 0 
 The resulting integrands are of the same form as the original integrand, so these reduction formulas can be repeatedly applied to drive the exponents m and p toward 0.
 These reduction formulas can be used for integrands having integer and/or fractional exponents.
 Special cases of these reductions formulas can be used for integrands of the form  when  by setting m to 0.

Integrands of the form xm (A + B xn) (a + b xn + c x2n)p 
 The resulting integrands are of the same form as the original integrand, so these reduction formulas can be repeatedly applied to drive the exponents m and p toward 0.
 These reduction formulas can be used for integrands having integer and/or fractional exponents.

References 

Rational functions